Albert Kandlbinder was a West German bobsledder who competed in the late 1950s and early 1960s. He won a silver medal in the four-man event at the 1960 FIBT World Championships in Cortina d'Ampezzo.

References
Bobsleigh four-man world championship medalists since 1930

German male bobsledders
Possibly living people
Year of birth missing